Jackson Uptown Commercial Historic District is a national historic district located at Jackson, Cape Girardeau County, Missouri.  The district encompasses 23 contributing buildings in the central business district of Jackson. It developed between about 1880 and 1953, and includes representative examples of Classical Revival style architecture.  Notable buildings include the Cape Girardeau County Savings Bank (c. 1885, 1952), Kertsners's Drug Store (c. 1900), Cape Girardeau County Courthouse (c. 1906-1908) designed by P.H. Weathers, and Jones Drug Store (c. 1885, 1908).

It was listed on the National Register of Historic Places in 2005.

References

Historic districts on the National Register of Historic Places in Missouri
Neoclassical architecture in Missouri
Historic districts in Cape Girardeau County, Missouri
National Register of Historic Places in Cape Girardeau County, Missouri